Chaetostomella rossica is a species of tephritid or fruit flies in the genus Chaetostomella of the family Tephritidae.

Distribution
Russia.

References

Tephritinae
Insects described in 1927
Diptera of Asia